Ornipressin is a vasoconstrictor, haemostatic and renal agent.

References

Peptides
Vasopressin receptor agonists
Antidiuretics